Centerville Independent School District is a public school district based in Centerville, Texas, USA. It contains an elementary school and a combined middle/high school.  The district also serves the community of Leona.

In 2009, the school district was rated "academically acceptable" by the Texas Education Agency.

References

External links
Centerville ISD

School districts in Leon County, Texas